Little River is the name of two rivers in the U.S. state of Oregon:

 Little River (North Umpqua River)
 Little River (Coast Fork Willamette River)